Mahmoud Obaidi (born in Baghdad, Iraq in 1966) is an Iraqi-Canadian artist whose work has been exhibited in museums and galleries around the world.

Life and career
Mahmoud Obaidi was born in Baghdad in 1966. He obtained a degree in fine arts from the Baghdad University in 1990. Like many Iraqi intellectuals and artists, he fled his war-torn country in 1991. After settling in Canada, he obtained his Masters of Fine Arts at the University of Guelph in Canada. He also obtained diplomas in new media and film from Toronto and Los Angeles.<ref>Westall, N., "Iraqi artist Mahmoud Obaidi ‘Baghdad Manifesto’ his first solo exhibition in the UK," Fad Magazine, 18 September 2016, Online:</ref>

He had his first international solo exhibition in 1995. His work has been exhibited extensively including at Qatar Museums Gallery, Doha; Mathaf: Arab Museum of Modern Art, Doha; Saatchi Gallery, London; the National Museum of Bahrain; the Institut du Monde Arabe, Paris; the National Gallery of Fine Arts, Amman; Station Museum of Contemporary Art, Texas; and the Musée d’Art Contemporain de Baie-Saint-Paul, Quebec, among others. His work is part of the permanent collection of a number of significant museums, foundations, and private collections.

Work

The artist’s work is held in a number of permanent collections including Mathaf: Arab Museum of Modern Art, Doha; the National Gallery of Fine Arts, Amman; the Sharjah Art Museum, Sharjah; the Musée d’Art Contemporain de Baie-Saint-Paul, Quebec; the Museum of Modern Art, Baghdad and the British Museum, London.

Select list of artworks
 Baghdad Manifesto Compact Home Project 2003-2004 
 Remains of a Ravaged City, 2015 
 Operation Iraqi Freedom Family, 2016 
 Fragments, 2016

Select list of exhibitions

 2016 Fragments: An Exhibition by Mahmoud Obaidi, Qatar Museums Gallery, Katara, Doha 
 2016 Fair Skies, Mathaf: Arab Museum of Modern Art, Doha 
 2016 Baghdad Manifesto,  Saatchi Gallery, London
 2015 The Imposter, 56th Venice Biennale, Venice
 2014 The Replacement, Meem Gallery, Dubai and Contemporary Art Platform, Kuwait City
 2013 Contemporary Arab Art: How Do You Sleep at Night?,  Meem Gallery, Dubai and Abu Dhabi Art, Abu Dhabi
 2013 The Cubes – Hajj: The Journey Through Art, Museum of Islamic Art, Doha
 2013 Dress Code, Abu Dhabi Music and Arts Foundation, Abu Dhabi
 2013 Confusionism, Katara Art Centre, Doha
 2012 Fair Skies – 25 years of Arab Creativity,  
 2013 Fair Skies – 25 Years of Arab Creativity, travelling exhibition National Museum of Bahrain, Manama (2013); Institut du Monde Arabe, Paris (2012); Fair Skies, Agial Art Gallery and Art Dubai, Dubai (2012)  
 2011 Gigabytes of My Memory – Art in Iraq Today, Meem Gallery, Dubai, and Beirut Exhibition Centre, Beirut
 2010 They Welcomed Us with Flowers, Bastakiya Art Fair, Dubai
 2010 My Homeland,  Art Sawa Gallery, Dubai
 200 Beyond the War: Contemporary Iraqi Artists of the Diaspora, LTHM Gallery, New York
 2009 Turtles – Iraqi Artists in Exile, Station Museum of Contemporary Art, Houston, Texas
 2009 Modernism and Iraq, Wallach Art Gallery, Columbia University, New York
 2006 Golden Leaves Book, Gallery Jouy, Switzerland, and T Cazacrou Foundation, Frankfurt
 2005 Dafatir: Contemporary Iraqi Book Art, University of North Texas Art Gallery, Denton and other locations (travelling exhibition)
 2005 Improvisation: Seven Iraqi Artists, Bissan Gallery, Doha, Al-Riwaq Gallery, Manama, and 4 Walls Gallery, Amman
 2005 Paris–Baghdad: Iraqi Artists, Musée du Montparnasse, Paris
 2003 Iraqi Art Now: Looking Out, Looking In, De Paul Art Museum, Chicago
 2002 The Ramona Project, 4 Walls Gallery, Amman
 1998 The Dome Project, Zavitz Gallery, Toronto and Public Art, India
 1994 Obaidi, Darat Al Funun, Amman
 1990 Cats’ Factory,'' Museum of Modern Art, Baghdad

See also
 Iraqi art
 Islamic art
 List of Iraqi artists

References 

1966 births
21st-century Iraqi painters
21st-century sculptors
Canadian abstract artists
Abstract painters
Abstract sculptors
Artists from Baghdad
Iraqi calligraphers
Iraqi ceramists
Iraqi contemporary artists
Living people
21st-century ceramists